This is an (incomplete) list of mountains in Saudi Arabia.

Peaks over 3,000 m

Peaks over 2,500 m

Highest peaks in the Hijaz Mountains

Highest peaks in the Midian Mountains

Highest peaks in the Tihamah

Highest peaks in the Najd

See also
 Asir Mountains
 Geography of Saudi Arabia
 Geology of Saudi Arabia
 Jildiyyah Mountain
 List of volcanoes in Saudi Arabia
 Shammar Mountains

Notes
 (*) These measurement are not exact. The shown heights are taken by GoogleEarth.

References
 Saudi Geological Survey:
 Saudi Geological Society
 Ministry of Petroleum and Minerals Resources: Aerial Survey Department
 GoogleEarth

 
Saudi Arabia
Mountains